The 2009–10 season was Oldham Athletic's 11th season in the third tier of the English football league system, and their 114th overall. The first-team squad was led by manager Dave Penney in his first season with the club, following the departure of former manager John Sheridan in the previous season.

Results

Legend

Pre-season and friendlies

League One
The 2009–10 Football League One fixtures were released on 17 June 2009, with Oldham Athletic opening their league campaign versus local rivals Stockport County on 8 August 2009. In Dave Penney's first competitive game in charge of the club, Oldham were held a scoreless draw against Stockport County. Despite having numerous shots, Owain Fôn Williams kept the Latics out of goal to keep the two teams level at 0–0 for the full 90 minutes.

League One

FA Cup

League Cup
On 16 June 2009, the draws for the first round of the 2009–10 Football League Cup was drawn. Oldham Athletic was drawn against fellow League One club Carlisle United. Throughout the game, both teams remained scoreless until an 89th-minute winner was scored by Scott Dobie. The goal allowed Carlisle to advance with a 1–0 victory, as Oldham were eliminated in the first round of the Cup.

Johnstone's Paint Trophy
On 15 August 2009, the First Round draw for the 2009–10 Football League Trophy was made on Soccer AM, where Oldham was drawn against League Two club Accrington Stanley. The Latics held a 1–0 lead at halftime after Danny Whitaker grabbed a goal in the 10th minute, though Accrington Stanley came back on level terms in the 60th minute due to an own goal by Oldham defender Sean Gregan. Phil Edwards scored the winning goal seven minutes later following a free kick, giving Accrington a 2–1 victory and knocking Oldham out of the competition in the First Round.

Squad statistics
Accurate as of end of season

Transfers

In

Out

Loan in

Loan out

Players

First-team squad
Squad at end of season

Left club during season

References

Notes

External links 
Fixture Schedule 2009/10 at OldhamAthletic.co.uk

Oldham Athletic
Oldham Athletic A.F.C. seasons